Al Awir, also spelled Al Aweer is a town in the Emirate of Dubai, United Arab Emirates, located about 35 kilometers from the city center.  It has long been a centre of agriculture and camel breeding. Among many other Dubai families who have farms at Al Awir, Dubai's ruling Maktoum family maintains a farm in the area.

It is home to the Al Awir Fruit & Vegetable Market, as well as Al Awir Central Jail.

In 2018 the immigration centre at Al Awir was the location of a major 'amnesty centre', where people who had overstayed their UAE work visas could apply to leave the country with no fines or penalties. 

Al Awir is adjacent to the Emirates Road (E611) and is bordered by Ras al Khor in Dubai and Lahbab to the East.

References

Populated places in Dubai